Aleksandr Bondar may refer to:

Aleksandr Bondar (footballer) (born 1967), Russian footballer
Aleksandr Bondar (diver) (born 1993), Russian diver